Middlesex-London Paramedic Service is the statutory Emergency medical services provider for Middlesex County, and London, Ontario. The service provides EMS to the City of London, the Townships of Adelaide Metcalfe, Lucan Biddulph, Middlesex Centre, North Middlesex, Southwest Middlesex, Strathroy-Caradoc, Thames Centre, Newbury. The Middlesex London Emergency Medical Services Authority delivers ambulance service to Middlesex and London in accordance with service and patient care standards set by the County of Middlesex, City of London, and Ministry of Health and Long Term Care. Medical oversight for controlled medical acts is provided under the direction of the Southwestern Ontario Regional Base Hospital Program.

The service is operated directly as a branch of the municipal government as an independent, third-service option provider, which means that the service is funded by the municipal tax base, and operates in much the same manner as any other municipal department, such as the police or fire department, or in some cases like a public utility, but retains its complete independence from all other departments.  While under municipal government control, it is required to comply with legislation and licensing standards provided by the Ontario provincial government.  It is not the only service provider in its area; private-for-profit medical transport services also provide routine, non-emergency transports and coverage for special events, but the statutory EMS system is the only provider permitted to service emergency calls.

Staff 
Middlesex-London employs 231 Primary and Advanced Care Paramedics and Support Staff.

Fleet 
 33 vehicles including:
 30 Ambulances
 3 Emergency Response Units

Operations 
Service is provided to a residential population of approximately 400,000 people, in the 9 local townships of Middlesex County.

Emergency service headquarters is located at 1035 Adelaide Street South in London. Air ambulance operations are provided within the City of London by Ornge, a privately owned air ambulance contractor, under contract to the Government of Ontario.

District 1

City of London
 Headquarters - 1035 Adelaide St South, London, Ontario
 Station 0 - 1035 Adelaide St South,  London, Ontario
 Station 1 - 340 Waterloo St, London, Ontario
 Station 13 - Byron - 3100 Colonel Talbot Rd, London, Ontario
 Station 16 - Horizon - 745 Horizon Drive, London, Ontario
 Station 4 - Trossacks - 1601 Trossacks Ave, London, Ontario
 Station 14 - Hyde Park - 2225 Hyde Park Rd, London, Ontario
 Station 10 - Dorchester - Dorchester Road, Thames Centre, Ontario
 Station 15 - Trafalgar - 2330 Traflagar Street, London, Ontario

District 2

North Middlesex
 Station 8 - Parkhill - 179 Mill St, Parkhill, Ontario
Southwest Middlesex
 Station 6 - Glencoe - 147 McKellar Street, Glencoe, Ontario
Middlesex Centre
 Station 12- Komoka - 22494 Komoka Rd, Komoka, Ontario
Lucan Biddulph
 Station 9 - Lucan - 188 George St, Lucan, Ontario
Strathroy-Caradoc
 Station 17 -  Strathroy - 351 Frances St, Strathroy, Ontario

See also

Paramedicine in Canada 

 List of EMS Services in Ontario
 Paramedics in Canada
 Emergency Medical Services in Canada

References 

Ambulance services in Canada
Organizations based in London, Ontario
Medical and health organizations based in Ontario
Companies based in London, Ontario